Pen Dal-aderyn is the westernmost point of mainland Wales.

It is in Pembrokeshire, west of St Davids. It means 'Bird-catching Head' in Welsh.

External links
 

Headlands of Pembrokeshire